61 Cygni  is a binary star system in the constellation Cygnus, consisting of a pair of K-type dwarf stars that orbit each other in a period of about 659 years. Of apparent magnitude 5.20 and 6.05, respectively, they can be seen with binoculars in city skies or with the naked eye in rural areas without light pollution.

61 Cygni first attracted the attention of astronomers when its large proper motion was first demonstrated by Giuseppe Piazzi in 1804. In 1838, Friedrich Bessel measured its distance from Earth at about 10.4 light-years, very close to the actual value of about 11.4 light-years; this was the first distance estimate for any star other than the Sun, and first star to have its stellar parallax measured. Among all stars or stellar systems listed in the modern Hipparcos Catalogue, 61 Cygni has the seventh-highest proper motion, and the highest among all visible stars or systems.

Over the course of the twentieth century, several different astronomers reported evidence of a massive planet orbiting one of the two stars, but recent high-precision radial velocity observations have shown that all such claims were unfounded. No planets have been confirmed in this stellar system to date.

Name
61 Cygni is relatively dim, so it does not appear on ancient star maps, nor is it given a name in western or Chinese systems.

The name "61 Cygni" is part of the Flamsteed designation assigned to stars. According to this designation scheme, devised by John Flamsteed to catalog his observations, stars of a particular constellation are numbered in the order of their right ascension, not in Greek letters as the Bayer designation does. The star does not appear under that name in Flamsteed's Historia Coelestis Britannica, although it has been stated by him that 61 Cygni actually corresponds to what he referred to as 85 Cygni in the 1712 edition. It has also been called "Bessel's Star" or "Piazzi's Flying Star".

Observation history

Early observations
The first well recorded observation of the star system using optical instruments was made by James Bradley on 25 September 1753, when he noticed that it was a double star. William Herschel began systematic observations of 61 Cygni as part of a wider study of binary stars. His observations led to the conclusion that binary stars were separated enough that they would show different movements in parallax over the year, and hoped to use this as a way to measure the distance to the stars.

In 1792, Giuseppe Piazzi noticed the high proper motion when he compared his own observations of 61 Cygni with those of Bradley, made 40 years earlier. This led to considerable interest in 61 Cygni by contemporary astronomers, and its continual observation since that date. Piazzi's repeated measurements led to a definitive value of its motion, which he published in 1804. It was in this record he christened the system as the "Flying Star".

Piazzi noted that this motion meant that it was probably one of the closest stars, and suggested it would be a prime candidate for an attempt to determine its distance through parallax measurements, along with two other possibilities, Delta Eridani and Mu Cassiopeiae.

Parallax measurement
A number of astronomers soon took up the task, including attempts by François Arago and Claude-Louis Mathieu in 1812, who recorded the parallax at 500 milliarcseconds (mas), and Christian Heinrich Friedrich Peters used Arago's data to calculate a value of 550 mas. Peters calculated a better value based on observations made by Bernhard von Lindenau at Seeburg between 1812 and 1814; he calculated it to be 470 ±510 mas. Von Lindenau had already noted that he had seen no parallax, and as Friedrich Georg Wilhelm von Struve pointed out after his own test series between 1818 and 1821, all of these numbers are more accurate than the accuracy of the instrument used.

Friedrich Wilhelm Bessel made a notable contribution in 1812 when he used a different method to measure distance. Assuming the orbital period of the two stars in the binary to be 400 years, he estimated the distance between the two this would require, and then measured the angular distance between the stars. This led to a value of 460 mas. He then followed this up with direct parallax measurements in a series of observations between 1815 and 1816, comparing it with six other stars. The two sets of measurements produced values of 760 and 1320 mas. All of these estimates, like earlier attempts by others, retained inaccuracies greater than the measurements.

When Joseph von Fraunhofer invented a new type of heliometer, Bessel carried out another set of measurements using this device in 1837 and 1838 at Königsberg. He published his findings in 1838 with a value of 369.0±19.1 mas to A and 260.5±18.8 to B, and estimated the center point to be at 313.6±13.6. This corresponds to a distance of about 600,000 astronomical units, or about 10.4 light-years. This was the first direct and reliable measurement of the distance to a star other than the Sun. His measurement was published only shortly before similar parallax measurements of Vega by Friedrich Georg Wilhelm von Struve and Alpha Centauri by Thomas Henderson that same year. Bessel continued to make additional measurements at Königsberg, publishing a total of four complete observational runs, the last in 1868. The best of these placed the center point at 360.2 ±12.1 mas, made during observations in 1849. This is close to the currently accepted value of 287.18 mas (yielding 11.36 light-years).

Only a few years after Bessel's measurement, in 1842 Friedrich Wilhelm Argelander noted that Groombridge 1830 had an even larger proper motion, and 61 Cygni became the second highest known. It was later moved further down the list by Kapteyn's Star and Barnard's Star. 61 Cygni has the seventh highest proper motion of all stellar systems listed in the modern Hipparcos Catalogue, but retains the title of highest proper motion among stars visible to the naked eye.

Binary observations
Due to the wide angular separation between 61 Cygni A and B, and the correspondingly slow orbital motion, it was initially unclear whether the two stars in the 61 Cygni system were a  gravitationally bound system or simply a juxtaposition of stars. von Struve first argued for its status as a binary in 1830, but the matter remained open.

However, by 1917 refined measured parallax differences demonstrated that the separation was significantly less. The binary nature of this system was clear by 1934, and orbital elements were published.

In 1911, Benjamin Boss published data indicating that the 61 Cygni system was a member of a comoving group of stars. This group containing 61 Cygni was later expanded to include 26 potential members. Possible members include Beta Columbae, Pi Mensae, 14 Tauri and 68 Virginis. The space velocities of this group of stars range from 105 to 114 km/s relative to the Sun.

Observations taken by planet search programs show that both components have strong linear trends in the radial velocity measurements.

Amateur observation
An observer using 7×50 binoculars can find 61 Cygni two binocular fields southeast of the bright star Deneb. The angular separation of the two stars is slightly greater than the angular size of Saturn (16–20″). So, under ideal viewing conditions, the binary system can be resolved by a telescope with a 7 mm aperture. This is
well within the capability for aperture of typical binoculars, though to resolve the binary these need a steady mount and some 10x magnification. With a separation of 28 arc-seconds between the component stars, 10× magnification would give an apparent separation of 280 arc-seconds, above the generally regarded eye resolution limit of 4 arc-minutes or 240 arc-seconds.

Properties
Although it appears to be a single star to the naked eye, 61 Cygni is a widely-separated binary star system, composed of two K class (orange) main sequence stars, the brighter 61 Cygni A and fainter 61 Cygni B, which have apparent magnitudes of 5.2 and 6.1, respectively. Both appear to be old-disk stars, with an estimated age that is older than the Sun. At a distance of just over 11 light-years, it is the 15th-nearest-known star system to the Earth (not including the Sun). 61 Cygni A is the fourth-nearest star that is visible to the naked eye for mid-latitude northern observers, after Sirius, Epsilon Eridani, and Procyon A. This system will make its closest approach at about 20,000 CE, when the separation from the Sun will be about 9 light-years. Smaller and dimmer than the Sun, 61 Cygni A has about 70 percent of a solar mass, 72 percent of its diameter and about 8.5 percent of its luminosity and 61 Cygni B has about 63 percent of a solar mass, 67 percent of its diameter, and 3.9 percent of its luminosity.
61 Cygni A's long-term stability led to it being selected as an "anchor star" in the Morgan–Keenan (MK) classification system in 1943, serving as the  K5 V "anchor point" since that time. Starting in 1953, 61 Cygni B has been considered a K7 V standard star (Johnson & Morgan 1953, Keenan & McNeil 1989).

61 Cygni A is a typical BY Draconis variable star designated as V1803 Cyg while 61 Cygni B is a flare type variable star named HD 201092 with their magnitudes varying 5.21 V and 6.03, respectively. The two stars orbit their common barycenter in a period of 659 years, with a mean separation of about 84 AU—84 times the separation between the Earth and the Sun. The relatively large orbital eccentricity of 0.48 means that the two stars are separated by about 44 AU at periapsis and 124 AU at apoapsis. The leisurely orbit of the pair has made it difficult to pin down their respective masses, and the accuracy of these values remain somewhat controversial. In the future this issue may be resolved through the use of asteroseismology. 61 Cygni A has about 11% more mass than 61 Cygni B.

The system has an activity cycle that is much more pronounced than the solar sunspot cycle. This is a complex activity cycle that varies with a period of about 7.5±1.7 years. The starspot activity combined with rotation and chromospheric activity is a characteristic of a BY Draconis variable. Because of differential rotation, this star's surface rotation period varies by latitude from 27 to 45 days, with an average period of 35 days.

The outflow of the stellar wind from component A produces a bubble within the local interstellar cloud. Along the direction of the star's motion within the Milky Way, this extends out to a distance of 30 AU, or roughly the orbital distance of Neptune from the Sun. This is lower than the separation between the two components of 61 Cygni, and so the two most likely do not share a common atmosphere. The compactness of the astrosphere is likely due to the low mass outflow and the relatively high velocity through the local interstellar medium.

61 Cygni B displays a more chaotic pattern of variability than A, with significant short-term flares. There is an 11.7-year periodicity to the overall activity cycle of B. Both stars exhibit stellar flare activity, but the chromosphere of B is 25% more active than for 61 Cygni A. As a result of differential rotation, the period of rotation varies by latitude from 32 to 47 days, with an average period of 38 days.

There is some disagreement over the evolutionary age of this system. Kinematic data gives an age estimate of about 10 Gyr. The ages based on chromospheric activity for A and B are 2.36 Gyr and 3.75 Gyr, respectively. Finally the age estimates using the isochrone method, which involve fitting the stars to evolutionary models, yield upper limits of 0.44 Gyr and 0.68 Gyr.

Claims of a planetary system
On different occasions, it has been claimed that 61 Cygni might have unseen low-mass companions, planets or a brown dwarf. Kaj Strand of the Sproul Observatory, under the direction of Peter van de Kamp, made the first such claim in 1942 using observations to detect tiny but systematic variations in the orbital motions of 61 Cygni A and B. These perturbations suggested that a third body of about 16 Jupiter masses must be orbiting 61 Cygni A. Reports of this third body served as inspiration for Hal Clement's 1953 science fiction novel Mission of Gravity. In 1957, van de Kamp narrowed his uncertainties, claiming that the object had a mass of eight times that of Jupiter, a calculated orbital period of 4.8 years, and a semi-major axis of 2.4 AU, where 1 AU is the average distance from the Earth to the Sun. In 1977, Soviet astronomers at the Pulkovo Observatory near Saint Petersburg suggested that the system included three planets: two giant planets with six and twelve Jupiter masses around 61 Cyg A, and one giant planet with seven Jupiter masses around 61 Cygni B.

In 1978, Wulff-Dieter Heintz of the Sproul Observatory proved that these claims were spurious, as they were unable to detect any evidence of such motion down to six percent of the Sun's mass—equivalent to about 60 times the mass of Jupiter.

In 2018, analysis of the Gaia (spacecraft) second data release (DR2) revealed significant proper motion anomalies in the orbits of the binary stars around each other; the stars were not quite orbiting around their centre of mass with 61 Cygni B also orbiting too slowly for its assumed mass. These anomalies taken together are indicative of the possible presence of a perturbing third object in orbit around 61 Cygni B.

The habitable zone for 61 Cygni A, defined as the locations where liquid water could be present on an Earth-like planet, is 0.26–0.58 AU. For 61 Cygni B, the habitable zone is 0.24–0.50 AU.

Refining planetary boundaries
Since no certain planetary object has been detected around either star so far, McDonald Observatory team has set limits to the presence of one or more planets around 61 Cygni A and 61 Cygni B with masses between 0.07 and 2.1 Jupiter masses and average separations spanning between 0.05 and 5.2 AU.

Because of the proximity of this system to the Sun, it is a frequent target of interest for astronomers. Both stars were selected by NASA as "Tier 1" targets for the proposed optical Space Interferometry Mission. This mission is potentially capable of detecting planets with as little as 3 times the mass of the Earth at an orbital distance of 2 AU from the star.

Measurements of this system appeared to have detected an excess of far infrared radiation, beyond what is emitted by the stars. Such an excess is sometimes associated with a disk of dust, but in this case it lies sufficiently close to one or both of the stars that it has not been resolved with a telescope. A 2011 study using the Keck Interferometer Nuller failed to detect any exozodiacal dust around 61 Cygni A.

Object for biosignature research
The two stars are among five (all nearby star) paradigms listed among those K-type stars of a type in a 'sweet spot' between Sun-analog stars and M stars for the likelihood of evolved life, per analysis of Giada Arney from NASA's Goddard Space Flight Center.

See also
 List of nearest stars
 Barnard's Star

Notes

References

External links

 
 

Cygnus (constellation)
Binary stars
BD+38 4343 and BD+38 4344
K-type main-sequence stars
Cygni, 61
0820
201091 2
High-proper-motion stars
104214 and 104217
8085 and 8086
Cygni, V1803
BY Draconis variables
Discoveries by Giuseppe Piazzi